Camille Delamarre is a French film editor and director, best known for directing The Transporter Refueled and Brick Mansions. He edited films including Transporter 3 and Taken 2, among others.

Career 
In 2014, Delamarre made his directing debut with the action film Brick Mansions, starring Paul Walker, David Belle and Rza. It was written by Luc Besson and Robert Mark Kamen and released on April 23, 2014.

In 2015, Delamarre directed another action thriller film The Transporter Refueled, a reboot of the Transporter franchise. The film stars Ed Skrein and Ray Stevenson and was released on September 4, 2015 in the United States by Relativity Media.

Filmography

References

External links 
 

Living people
1979 births
French film directors
French film editors